This is a list of films produced by the Ollywood film industry based in Bhubaneshwar and Cuttack in 1996:

A-Z

References

1996
 Ollywood
1990s in Orissa
Ollywood
1996 in Indian cinema